Clemente Fracassi (5 March 1917 – 2 February 1993) was an Italian film producer, director and screenwriter. His career spanned from 1939 to 1967.

Selected filmography
 To Live in Peace (1947 - producer)
 Senza pietà (1948 - producer)
 A Dog's Life (1950 - producer)
 Barefoot Savage (1952 - director, writer)
 Aida (1953 - director)
 Andrea Chénier (1955 - director)

External links

1917 births
1993 deaths
Italian film producers
Italian film directors
20th-century Italian screenwriters
Italian male screenwriters
20th-century Italian male writers